The University of Management and Technology (UMT) is a private for-profit university in Arlington, Virginia. The university was founded in 1998 and offers accredited undergraduate and graduate degrees, including associate, bachelor's, master's, and doctoral degrees as well as certificate programs. UMT's degree programs in project management are also accredited by the Global Accreditation Center (GAC) of the Project Management Institute (PMI). UMT is an institutional member of the Council of Higher Education Accreditation – CHEA and a Global Registered Education Provider of PMI. UMT is authorized by the U.S. Department of Education to provide Federal Student Aid (FSA) to eligible students enrolled in eligible programs. UMT is authorized by the U.S. Citizenship and Immigration Services of the U.S. Department of Homeland Security to accept F-1 visa students. UMT is authorized by the U.S. Department of State to sponsor J-1 visa international exchange students. UMT is approved by the Virginia State Approving Agency for the purposes of various veterans' education benefits programs. The institution is certified by the U.S. Department of Education to participate in Title IV, HEA programs Higher Education Act of 1965. The institution will undergo another comprehensive review for its next renewal of accreditation by January 2026.

History

Origins 
When the university was founded in 1998,  Dr. Yanping Chen served as the founding president while Chen's husband, Dr. J. Davidson Frame, served as the founding dean of the university. Prior to establishing UMT, Frame spent 19 years on the faculty of George Washington University, where he served as Chair of the Management Science Department, Director of the Program on Science, Technology and Innovation, and established the Project Management Master's degree program at the Business School. Chen was a leading expert on science and technology policy, with special expertise on the early days of China's astronaut program.

At its inception, UMT offered two graduate degrees: an MBA and a Master of Science in Management (MSM) with a focus on project management. In 2003, it was authorized to offer a full range of degree programs, including the associate's, bachelor's, master's, and doctoral degrees, making it one of the earliest fully online degree programs in the United States.

UMT students reside in 50 states, the District of Columbia, 4 territories of the United States, and 78 countries. As of January 2019, UMT has provided various levels of education programs to 24,380 students. Of these, 13,320 have earned their degrees from UMT.

Academics

Authorizations 
UMT is authorized to operate by the State Council of Higher Education for Virginia (SCHEV).  It is accredited by the Distance Education Accrediting Commission (DEAC).

UMT's project management degree programs have specialized accreditation by the Global Accreditation Center of the Project Management Institute. UMT is also an institutional member of the Council for Higher Education Accreditation.

Student life
UMT provides Distance and off-campus learning, the university faculty and staff have extensive management and education experience working with major universities, companies, nonprofit organizations, and government agencies. These entities include government branches, such as The White House, the National Institute of Standards and Technology, the Department of Defense, the Department of Energy, the Department of States, the National Health Institute, the Internal Revenue Service, and the Social Security Administration; large corporations, such as AT&T, Lucent Technologies, NCR, SITA (France), ABB (Switzerland and Sweden), IBM, Motorola, Hewlett-Packard, Verizon; and international organizations, such as the World Bank.

Ranking 
UMT has been ranked by Military Advanced Education & Transition Magazine as one of MAE&T Top Colleges and Universities since 2011–2018.

Financial aid 
Since its inception in 1998, UMT has not increased its tuition fees, which have been $370 per credit hour of instruction for more than twenty years. UMT offers financial aid and scholarships, including a Military Scholarship to all active duty US military personnel and veterans, a First Responder Scholarship, and Project Management Institute Education Foundation Scholarships. UMT participates in the Federal Student Aid loan program, enabling students to acquire Federal student loans and Pell Grants if needed.

References

External links

Educational institutions established in 1998
Distance Education Accreditation Commission
Private universities and colleges in Virginia
Education in Arlington County, Virginia
1998 establishments in Virginia
For-profit universities and colleges in the United States